Kim Myeong-joon is a South Korean film director and cinematographer. Kim's directorial feature film Our School (2007), a documentary about the lives of ethnic Korean students in Japan, won the BIFF Mecenat Award for best documentary at the 2006 Busan International Film Festival and the Kim Yong-gun Memorial Society prize in 2008. His latest baseball-themed documentary Strangers on the Field (2015), which also focused on Koreans that have grown up in Japan, debuted at the 19th Busan International Film Festival in 2014.

Filmography 
Hibernation (short film, 1998) - cinematographer
Flower Island (2001) - cinematographer
Wanee & Junah (2001) - cinematographer
Memories of a Zoo (short film, 2002) - cinematographer
M(other), Beautiful May (2003) - cinematographer
HANA (documentary, 2003) - director, cinematographer, editor, executive producer
Our School (documentary, 2007) - director, screenwriter, cinematographer, narrator, editor, lighting
Boy Meets Boy (2008) - cinematographer
The Sword with No Name (2009) - cinematographer, storyboard
Just Friends? (2009) - cinematographer
Ghost (Be with Me) (2010) - cinematographer
Short! Short! Short! 2010 (2011) - cinematographer
Two Weddings and a Funeral (2012) - cinematographer
Strangers on the Field  (documentary, 2015) - director, screenwriter, cinematographer, editor, actor

References

External links 
 
 
 
 

Living people
South Korean film directors
South Korean screenwriters
Year of birth missing (living people)